The following 3 teams of players competed in the 2004 Electron-Land Cup - a professional Go tournament.

Blue Dragon

White Tiger

Phoenix

See also 

 Go competitions
 International Go Federation
 List of professional Go tournaments

Go competitions in South Korea
2004 in go